Gotha Ost station is a railway station in the municipality of Gotha, located in the Gotha district in Thuringia, Germany.

Notable places nearby
Gotha East Airfield

References

Ost
Buildings and structures in Gotha (district)